Hysteropezizella is a genus of fungi in the family Dermateaceae. The genus, first described by F. von Höhnel in 1917, contains 19 species.

See also 

 List of Dermateaceae genera

References

External links 

 Hysteropezizella at Index Fungorum

Dermateaceae genera
Taxa named by Franz Xaver Rudolf von Höhnel